Flecha is a surname. Notable people with the surname include:

Juan Antonio Flecha (born 1977), Argentina-born Spanish road bicycle racer
Mateo Flecha "El Viejo" (1481–1553), Spanish composer
Ramon Flecha (born 1952), professor of sociology at the University of Barcelona